North Enid is a town in Garfield County, Oklahoma, United States. The population was 860 at the 2010 census. The town is served by the Chisholm school district. North Enid was the original railroad town site in the Enid–Pond Creek Railroad War.

Geography
It is bordered to the west, south, and east by the city of Enid, the county seat.

U.S. Route 64 runs along the western edge of the town as 4th Street, leading south into the center of Enid. U.S. Routes 60 and 81 join US 64 from the west, and all three highways form the northern portion of the town's western edge. The combined highway runs north  to a point west of Pond Creek.

Demographics

As of the census of 2010, there were 860 people, up from 796 people in 2000. In 2000, there were 302 households, and 244 families residing in the town. There were 313 housing units at an average density of 138.7 per square mile (53.5/km2). The racial makeup of the town was 96.48% White, 0.25% African American, 1.63% Native American, and 1.63% from two or more races. Hispanic or Latino of any race were 0.38% of the population.

There were 302 households, out of which 33.1% had children under the age of 18 living with them, 75.2% were married couples living together, 3.3% had a female householder with no husband present, and 18.9% were non-families. 17.2% of all households were made up of individuals, and 10.6% had someone living alone who was 65 years of age or older. The average household size was 2.64 and the average family size was 2.97.

In the town, the population was spread out, with 24.6% under the age of 18, 5.5% from 18 to 24, 25.4% from 25 to 44, 29.5% from 45 to 64, and 14.9% who were 65 years of age or older. The median age was 42 years. For every 100 females, there were 96.5 males. For every 100 females age 18 and over, there were 93.5 males.

The median income for a household in the town was $47,212, and the median income for a family was $51,667. Males had a median income of $33,000 versus $21,484 for females. The per capita income for the town was $18,416. About 4.8% of families and 5.5% of the population were below the poverty line, including 5.0% of those under age 18 and 15.8% of those age 65 or over.

Education
It is zoned to Chisholm Public Schools.

See also

 List of cities and towns in Oklahoma

References

External links

Towns in Garfield County, Oklahoma
Towns in Oklahoma
Enid, Oklahoma